SS Port Quebec was under construction for the Port Line when she was requisitioned by the Ministry of War Transport for completion as the auxiliary minelayer HMS Port Quebec. She joined the Royal Navy 1st Minelaying Squadron based at Kyle of Lochalsh (port ZA) laying mines for the World War II Northern Barrage. After minelaying was completed in October 1943, she was retained for conversion to a repair ship and renamed HMS Deer Sound (F99) in 1944. She was then returned to the Port Line in 1947.

Notes

References
 
 

Minelayers of the Royal Navy
1939 ships
World War II minelayers of the United Kingdom